Deivos is a four-piece Polish brutal death metal band from Lublin.

Band history
Deivos was formed between 1997 and 1998 by guitarist Tomasz Kołcon of Engraved, guitarist Maciej Nawrocki, and vocalist Marcin Górniak of Ravendusk. The band recorded its first demo, Praised by Generations, in 1999 with the aid of a drum machine. In 2000, drummer Krzysztof Saran of Abusiveness and bassist Jarek Pieńkoś joined the line-up. Near the end of 2001, Nawrocki and Górniak left the band, and Pieńkoś took over the band's vocals. In 2003, Deivos recorded the mini CD Hostile Blood, gaining them popularity in the metal underground as well as a deal with the Butchery Music label. The band's line-up was completed in 2004 with the addition of Abusiveness guitarist Mścisław, and their first full-length album, Emanation from Below, was recorded and released in 2006.
In May 2009, the band signed with Unique Leader Records. Unique Leader Records released the band's third studio album, Gospel of Maggots, in February 2010. Then, in 2011, another album was released: Demiurge of the Void.

Discography
 1999: Praised by Generations (demo)
 2003: Hostile Blood
 2006: Emanation from Below
 2010: Gospel of Maggots
 2011: Demiurge of the Void
 2015: Theodicy
 2017: Endemic Divine

References

External links
 Official Website
 Deivos at MySpace
 Deivos at Encyclopedia Metallum

Polish heavy metal musical groups
Polish death metal musical groups 
Musical quintets